Arcelin is a Polish village.

Arcelin may also refer to;

Jean Arcelin (born 1962), Swiss teacher and painter
Nicole Roy-Arcelin (born 1941), Canadian politician
Paul Arcelin, Haitian activist